Predator is an American science fiction action anthology media franchise centered on the film series depicting humankind's encounters with an intelligent race of extraterrestrial trophy-seeking hunters known as the "Yautja". Produced and distributed by 20th Century Fox, the series began with Predator (1987), directed by John McTiernan, and was followed by three sequels, Predator 2 (1990), Predators (2010), The Predator (2018), and one prequel, Prey (2022).  The series has led to numerous novels, comics, and video game spin-offs such as Predator: Concrete Jungle (2005) and Predator: Hunting Grounds (2020). The Alien vs. Predator franchise combines the continuities and universe of the Alien franchise with the Predator franchise and consists of two films as well as varying series of comics, books, and video games.

Premise
The Predator franchise depicts a series of deadly encounters between humanity and a hostile, trophy hunting, extraterrestrial species known as the Yautja. Predominantly transpiring in the present day of the 20th and 21st century, the series comprises films that, while largely independent, portray human confrontations with Yautjas in different locations. Drawn by heat and conflict, the creatures have been travelling to Earth for centuries  in order to hunt Humans; the planet's "most dangerous game." 

While brutal and cruel by human standards, the Predators are disciplined warriors bound by strict codes of honor. They primarily target individuals who can theoretically fight back, such as soldiers, criminals and law enforcement. They will not harm unarmed civilians, pregnant women, children or those with a debilitating condition or illness. Unlike most movie monsters, such as the xenomorph from the Alien films or the Terminator, Yautja are capable of both mercy and reason, though they seldom show either during the course of the series. The Yautja race, or at least a faction within it, are also known to abduct humans, among other beings, and hunt them on planets which they maintain as game preserves.

Background
Predator was John McTiernan's first studio film as director. The studio hired screenplay writer Shane Black to not only play a supporting role in the film, but to keep an eye on McTiernan due to the director's inexperience. Jean-Claude Van Damme was originally cast as the film's creature, the idea being that the physical action star would use his martial arts skills to make the creature an agile, ninja-esque hunter. When compared to Arnold Schwarzenegger, Carl Weathers, and Jesse Ventura, actors known for their bodybuilding regimes, it became apparent a more physically imposing man was needed to make the creature appear threatening. Eventually, Van Damme was removed from the film and replaced by the actor and mime artist Kevin Peter Hall. A Van Damme easter egg was eventually featured in The Predator.

The Yautja's design is credited to special effects artist Stan Winston. While flying to Japan with Aliens director James Cameron, Winston, who had been hired to design the Predator, was doing concept art on the flight. Cameron saw what he was drawing and said, "I always wanted to see something with mandibles", and Winston subsequently included them in his designs. Schwarzenegger recommended Winston after his experience working on The Terminator.

The film's creature was originally designed with a long neck, a dog-like head and a single eye. This design was abandoned when it became apparent that the jungle locations would make shooting the complex design too difficult. Originally, the studio contracted the makeup effects for the creature from Richard Edlund's Boss Film Creature Shop. However, with problems filming the creature in Mexico and attempts to create a convincing monster of Van Damme, wearing a very different body suit, failing, makeup effects responsibilities were given to Winston and his studio, R/Greenberg Associates. According to former Boss Film Creature Shop makeup supervisor Steve Johnson, the makeup failed because of an impractical design by McTiernan that included  extensions that gave the creature a backward bent satyr-leg. The design did not work in the jungle locations. After six weeks of shooting in the jungles of Palenque, Mexico, the production had to shut down so that Winston could make the new creature. This took eight months and then filming resumed for five weeks.

The clicking sound of the creature was provided by Peter Cullen. Despite his resolution not to voice any more monsters following injuries to his throat sustained during the ADR of King Kong, his agent convinced him to audition. The clicking sound was inspired by a mixture of the visual of the creature and his recollection of a dying horseshoe crab.

R/Greenberg Associates created the film's optical effects, including the creature's ability to become invisible, its thermal vision point-of-view, its glowing blood, and the electric spark effects. The invisibility effect was achieved by having someone in a bright red suit (because it was the farthest opposite of the green of the jungle and the blue of the sky) the size of the creature. The take was then repeated without the actors using a 30% wider lens on the camera. When the two takes were combined optically, a vague outline of the alien could be seen with the background scenery bending around its shape. For the thermal vision, infrared film could not be used because it did not register in the range of body temperature wavelengths. The glowing blood was achieved by green liquid from chem-lite sticks used by campers. The electrical sparks were rotoscoped animation using white paper pin registered on portable light tables to black-and-white prints of the film frames. The drawings were composited by the optical crew for the finished effects.

In an interview on Predator Special Edition, actor Carl Weathers said many of the actors would secretly wake up as early as 3 a.m. to work out before the day's shooting, in order to look "pumped" during the scene. Weathers also stated that he would act as if his physique was naturally given to him, and would work out only after all the other actors were nowhere to be seen. It was reported that actor Sonny Landham was so unstable on the set that a bodyguard was hired; not to protect Landham, but to protect the other cast members from him.

According to Schwarzenegger, filming was physically demanding as he had to swim in very cold water and spent three weeks covered in mud for the climactic battle with the monster. In addition, cast and crew endured very cold temperatures in the Mexican jungle that required heat lamps to be on all of the time. Schwarzenegger also faced the challenge of working with Kevin Peter Hall who could not see in the creature's suit. Hall could not see out of the mask and had to rehearse his scenes with it off and then memorize where everything was.

The film was particularly successful and subsequently inspired a number of comic books, video games and popular anecdotes within the media. Schwarzenegger was asked to reprise his role in a Predator sequel, but was already attached to Terminator 2: Judgment Day and could not accept the role. The character was rewritten from the developing sequel's script, and the sequel to Predator, directed by Stephen Hopkins, was scheduled for 1990.

Due to excessive violence and nudity scenes, Predator 2 was the first film to be given the newly instituted NC-17 rating in the United States. It was eventually rated R by the Motion Picture Association of America after being re-cut to its final theatrical length. The film cast Danny Glover in the lead role, and reprised Kevin Peter Hall as the Predator. Also, returning to the role of Anna in the sequel, Elpidia Carrillo was slated to be in two scenes but was cut back to a brief appearance on a video screen in the government agents' surveillance trailer. Her character is showing damage to the Central American jungle caused by the explosion at the conclusion of the first film.

Films
A running gag of the series is that they each have a running time of exactly 107 minutes. This tradition was broken with the fifth film (and first non-theatrical release) in the series, Prey.

Predator (1987)

An elite paramilitary rescue team, led by Major Dutch is on a covert operation in a Central American jungle where they are tasked with rescuing an official and his aide from guerrillas when they encounter a highly dangerous alien creature with futuristic technology who hunts them for sport and are forced to find a way to defeat it before it kills off the entire team while awaiting a helicopter rescue.

Predator 2 (1990)

In the record-hot summer of 1997, a different Predator arrives in Los Angeles and hunts violent gang members, drawing the attention of the local police force, specifically Lieutenant Harrigan, who pursues the creature as it rampages throughout the city. The creature itself is in turn being hunted by the secretive government task-force OWLF, led by CIA agent Peter Keyes, which wishes to capture it for study.

Predators (2010)

A group of notorious mercenaries and murderers find themselves kidnapped and transported to an alien game preserve jungle planet, where they have to learn to work together in order to fight off a band of Super Predators and other alien creatures stalking them and find a way off this world.

The Predator (2018)

After witnessing the crash of a Predator spaceship on Earth and hiding some of the remains, U.S. Army Ranger Quinn McKenna and a team of PTSD-afflicted soldiers must take down a pair of Predators, including a new enhanced Predator which was genetically enhanced by its species. The Predator canon is expanded by distinguishing  multiple types and purposes of the Predator species.

Prey (2022)

With the sale of 21st Century Fox's assets to The Walt Disney Company, the future of the series was called into question, though Bob Iger confirmed that certain properties would remain R-rated. In December 2019, Dan Trachtenberg was announced to be developing a film under the working title of Skulls, with a script from Patrick Aison, set during the American Civil War. In November 2020, it was revealed that the project was actually a fifth film in the Predator franchise. Trachtenberg indicated that he had been working on the film since 2016, with the intention to market the project without any references to Predator. The Walt Disney Company produced the project through their 20th Century Studios banner. In May 2021, Amber Midthunder was announced to star. In late July, the title was shortened to Skull before officially becoming  Prey in November; it was released on Hulu on August 5, 2022.

Naru, a skilled Comanche warrior, is striving to prove herself as a hunter, and finds herself having to protect her people from a Predator as well as from French fur traders who are destroying the Buffalo her people rely on for survival.

Future
In June 2022, Dan Trachtenberg stated that there are discussions for additional installments being developed after the release of Prey. The filmmaker stated that moving forward, the intent is to do things that have not been done before in the franchise. In August, Bennett Taylor expressed interest in reprising his role as Raphael Adolini as "the pirate he is" in a potential prequel to Prey, serving as a loose adaptation of the 1996 comic book Predator: 1718 in which Adolini was introduced, reading it as research before shooting Prey, having aimed to "bring as much of [Raphael] into Prey that made sense".

Crossover series

Inspired by the Dark Horse Comics series, the filmmakers of Predator 2 (1990) incorporated an easter egg in which an Alien skull was seen in a Predator trophy case. Expansions upon this shared universe between the Alien and Predator franchises followed through comics and video games, leading up to the launch of a film franchise with the release of Alien vs. Predator in 2004, followed by Aliens vs. Predator: Requiem in 2007. The franchise has spawned various comics, novels, video games, and other merchandise based upon or inspired by the films. A third film has been variously rumored since the production of Requiem. In mid-2018, Shane Black, the director of The Predator, expressed his belief that a third Alien vs. Predator could still happen, indicating the studio's interest in both franchises.

Alien vs. Predator (2004)

In 2004, a Predator mothership arrives in Earth orbit to draw humans to an ancient Predator training ground on Bouvetøya, an island about one thousand miles north of Antarctica. A buried pyramid giving off a "heat bloom" attracts a group of explorers led by billionaire and self-taught engineer Charles Bishop Weyland (Lance Henriksen), the original founder and CEO of Weyland Industries, who unknowingly activates an Alien egg production line as a hibernating Alien Queen is awakened within the pyramid. Three Predators descend to the planet and enter the structure, killing all humans in their way with the intention of hunting the newly formed Aliens, while the scattered explorers are captured alive by Aliens and implanted with embryos. Two Predators die in the ensuing battle with an Alien, while the third allies itself with the lone surviving human, Alexa "Lex" Woods (Sanaa Lathan), while making their way out of the pyramid as it is destroyed by the Predator's wrist bomb and eventually does battle with the escaped Alien Queen on the surface. The Queen is defeated by being dragged down by a water tower into the dark depths of the frozen sea, but not before she fatally wounds the last Predator. The orbiting Predator mothership uncloaks and the crew retrieves the fallen Predator. A Predator elder gives Lex a spear as a sign of respect, and then departs. Once in orbit it is revealed that an Alien Chestburster was present within the corpse, thus a predator/alien hybrid is born.

Aliens vs. Predator: Requiem (2007)

Set immediately after the events of the previous film, the Predalien hybrid aboard the Predator scout ship, having just separated from the mothership shown in the previous film, has grown to full adult size and sets about killing the Predators aboard the ship, causing it to crash in the small town of Gunnison, Colorado. The last surviving Predator activates a distress beacon containing a video recording of the Predalien, which is received by a veteran Predator on the Predator homeworld, who sets off towards Earth to "clean up" the infestation. When it arrives, the Predator tracks the Aliens into a section of the sewer below the town. He removes evidence of their presence as he moves along using a corrosive blue liquid and uses a laser net to try to contain the creatures, but the Aliens still manage to escape into the town above. The Predator fashions a plasma pistol from its remaining plasma caster and hunts Aliens all across town, accidentally cutting the power to the town in the process. During a confrontation with human survivors, the Predator loses its plasma pistol. The Predator then fights the Predalien singlehandedly, and the two mortally wound one another just as the US air force drops a tactical nuclear bomb on the town, incinerating both combatants along with the Predalien's warriors and hive, as well as the few remaining humans in the town. The salvaged plasma pistol is then taken to a Ms. Yutani of the Yutani Corporation, foreshadowing an advancement in technology leading to the future events of the Alien films.

Short films

On October 19, 2010, Predators was released on home video and included the two prequel short films Moments of Extraction and Crucified, along with the prequel short film The Chosen, which had aired as a television and cinema advertisement prior to the release of Predators. Loot Crate (commonly known for producing and distributing various officially licensed merchandise based on the Alien, Predator, Alien vs. Predator, and Prometheus brands) released a VR 360° short film titled Predator vs. Colonial Marines in February 2016,  directed by Julian Higgins and written by Peter Weidman in which a troop of Colonial Marines storm a Weyland-Yutani warehouse and encounter the deadly alien hunter. The Predator was released on DVD, Blu-ray and 4K Ultra HD formats on December 18, 2018, in America, alongside the short film The Predator Holiday Special, in which Santa Claus and his elves and reindeer encounter the Predators at the North Pole.

Cast and crew

Principal cast

Additional crew

Reception

Box office performance
List indicator
 indicates figures based on available information.

Note that the figures in this table are not inflation adjusted

Critical and public response

Music

Home media

Other media

Novels

Several novelizations based upon the movies have been released.

Movie novelizations
 Predator by Paul Monette, Jove Books, June 1, 1987, 
 Predator 2 by Simon Hawke, Jove Books, December 1990, 
 The Predator: Hunters and Hunted by James A. Moore, Titan Books, July 31, 2018 
 The Predator by Christopher Golden & Mark Morris, Titan Books, September 2018,

Original novels
 Predator: Concrete Jungle by Nathan Archer
 Predator: Cold War by Nathan Archer
 Predator: Big Game by Sandy Schofield
 Predator: Forever Midnight by John Shirley
 Predator: Flesh and Blood by Michael Jan Friedman
 Predator: Turnabout by Steve Perry
 Predator: South China Sea by Jeff VanderMeer
 Predator: Prey to the Heavens by John Arcudi and Javier Saltares
 The Predator: Hunters and Hunted by James A. Moore
 Predator: Stalking Shadows by James A. Moore

Comic books

Dark Horse Comics published various lines based on the franchise. The Fire and Stone (2014–2015) and Life and Death (2016–2017) series further explored what happened in the Alien, Predator, Alien vs. Predator, and Prometheus universe following the events of the 2012 film Prometheus. In July 2020, Marvel Comics announced that it had acquired the comic book rights to the Predator franchise, in addition to the rights to the Alien and Alien vs. Predator franchises.

Books
Other books expanding this fictional universe have been released through the years, and also such that depict the background to the films, including works by special effects company Amalgamated Dynamics Incorporated (ADI) which has worked with the Alien, Predator and Alien vs. Predator films.
 Predator The Official Movie Special (2018)
 The Predator: The Art and Making of the Film (2018)

Video games

 Predator (1987)
 Predator 2 (1990)
 Predator 2 (1992)
 Predator: Concrete Jungle (2005)
 Predator: Hunting Grounds (2020)

Pinball
The Predators have appeared in two virtual pinball tables.  The first one is a pinball adaptation of the first two Predator films, one of four pinball tables in the 1999 computer game Sci-Fi Pinball, with the other three tables being based on Aliens, Buffy the Vampire Slayer and The Fly, three other Fox horror films.  The second one is a loose pinball adaptation of Alien vs. Predator, developed by Zen Studios and available as an add-on pack for Zen Pinball 2, Pinball FX 2 and Pinball FX 3 on April 26, 2016.  Based on the premise and setting (though not the plot) of that film, this table is played entirely from the perspective of a Predator ascending the ranks to become a seasoned warrior and Alien hunter, with two of the film's human leads being the table's announcers.

In the early 2010s, pinball manufacturer SKIT-B attempted to create an unauthorized physical pinball adaptation of the Predator franchise, without securing licensing rights from franchise owner 20th Century Fox.  After suffering from legal problems, the pinball table was cancelled on March 24, 2015, and thus, only a few prototypes of the pinball table exists to this day.

Board games
 Legendary Encounters: A Predator Deck Building Game (2015)

Other appearances
 The Predator is a downloadable character in Mortal Kombat X (2015).
 The Predator is an unlockable outfit and hostile NPC in Fortnite Battle Royale Chapter 2 Season 5.
 The Predator is a free challenging boss featured in Tom Clancy's Ghost Recon Wildlands.

See also
 List of space science fiction franchises
 List of films featuring extraterrestrials
 List of monster movies
Predatoroonops, a genus of spider named in honor of the Predator

Further reading
 Beautiful Monsters: The Unofficial and Unauthorised Guide to the Alien and Predator Films (by David A. McIntee, Telos, 272 pages, 2005)

References

External links

 Predator Community
 Alien vs. Predator Central
 
 
 "Behind the scenes of the Predator stop-motion holiday special". Entertainment Weekly

 
20th Century Studios franchises
Action film franchises
American film series
Film franchises introduced in 1987
Film series introduced in 1987
Films adapted into comics
Horror film franchises
Horror mass media franchises
Science fiction film franchises
Science fiction horror film series